Apthamitra is a 2004 Indian Kannada-language horror film directed by P. Vasu, and stars  Vishnuvardhan, Soundarya and Ramesh Arvind in the lead roles with Prema, Dwarakish and Avinash in supporting roles. This was Soundarya's last film in her career which ended with two posthumous releases - the other being the Telugu movie Shiva Shankar which released few days before Apthamitra. The movie is an official adaptation of the 1993 Malayalam film Manichithrathazhu with a few scenes borrowed from the 1997 Malayalam film Aaraam Thampuran. The film was released on 27 August 2004 to highly positive reviews. It ran for one year in the main theaters across Karnataka and was one of the highest-grossing films of the year. Apthamitra was later followed by its sequel, Aptharakshaka (2010). P. Vasu also remade the film in Tamil in 2005 as Chandramukhi with 
Rajinikanth and Jyothika in the leads. Late actress Soundarya is remembered for her performance in this film.

Plot
Ramesh and Ganga are a married couple who recently move into Mysore to buy an ancient palace, against the wishes of his uncles and family elders. His uncle agrees to reside with them with his two daughters Vani and Hema, on one condition that the room on the first floor which is locked and sealed should not be visited by anyone in the family. They have their caretaker Rangajja, who lives in the outhouse with his granddaughter Sowmya.

During their stay in the house, they learn that this palace once belonged to Raja Vijaya Rajendra Bahaddur. He had a court dancer named Nagavalli from Andhra Pradesh, whom he was in love with. But Nagavalli already loved a fellow dancer named Ramanatha, who used to reside in a house just behind the palace. When the Raja discovered their affair on a Durgashtami day, he beheaded Dancer Ramanatha and burned Nagavalli alive. So Nagavalli vowed to burn the Raja alive on the very same Durgashtami day.

Strange things start to happen in the palace and everyone suspects Sowmya, who is always found at the place of the incident. So, Ramesh calls in his psychiatrist friend Vijay to help him clear the misconceptions regarding the palace and its history. Ramesh's uncle is unhappy with the way Vijay functions and is suspicious of him. Vani, Ramesh's cousin is in love with an orphan-dance teacher, Mahadev who incidentally resides in the same house behind the palace. Vijay learns of this and tells Ramesh's uncle about this and the alliance is approved by all in the family and their marriage is fixed.

When the whole family is out of town to visit Mahadev, to decide on his wedding with Vani, Ganga with help from Sowmya opens the room on the first floor with the key given by Sowmya. While she entered the room, Sowmya comes running to tell her not to open the door as the key maker who made the key had died. But Ganga told her not to believe in these superstitions. During this time there are attempts to kill Ramesh by someone unknown, which every time is foiled by Vijay. Even Vani is attacked once by someone unknown. So Ramesh's uncle calls upon an Acharya Ramachandra Shastri to perform some peace ritual upon the palace.

Though Ramesh is not interested in all these proceedings he agrees with his advice of Vijay. On the eve of Mahadev and Vani's engagement ceremony, Ganga accuses Mahadev of trying to molest her - which is refused by both Mahadev and Vijay. Upon hearing this Ramesh gets angry at Vijay and shouts at him to get out of his house. Acharya stops the family from doing so and asks Vijay to tell them the mystery behind the strange incidents. Vijay reveals to everyone that Ganga who turned into Nagavalli is behind all the strange incidents and Ganga who turned into Nagavalli tried to kill Ramesh and Vani because Nagavalli thinks that Mahadevan is her lover Ramanathan.

Ganga who visited the first-floor room was enamored by Nagavalli and her diary. Since Ganga suffered from Split personality disorder, the mystery behind Nagavalli's story compelled her to assume herself as Nagavalli, compelling the spirit of Nagavalli to enter her body. She (Nagavalli inside Ganga) now intends to kill Vijay as he had posed in front of her as Raja Vijaya Rajendra Bahaddur, on the coming Durgashtami day as vowed by Nagavalli while dying.

Vijay explains to everyone that since Nagavalli inside Ganga thinks that Mahadev is the dancer Ramnath. Vijay on Durgashtami Day, makes Nagavalli (Ganga) believe that he himself is the king, and employs a trap door to make Nagavalli burn a dummy with his image on it. Nagavalli satisfies herself and leaves Ganga's body. Vijay is also safe. Vijay helps Ganga psychologically later to regain herself. Ramesh thanks Vijay for his help.

Cast
 Vishnuvardhan as Dr. Vijay / Vijaya Rajendra Bahaddur
 Soundarya as Ganga / Nagavalli 
 Ramesh Aravind as Ramesh
 Prema as Sowmya
 Dwarakish as Mukunda
 Avinash as Acharya Ramachandra Shastri
 Pramila Joshai as Rukku 
 Shivaram as Rangajja
 Satyajit as Shivananda 
 Shridhar Jain as Dancer Ramnath and Prof. Mahadev 
 Bhoomika Shetty as Hema
 Sneha
 Jaya Muruli
 Ramanand
 Muthukaalai as Henchman in Vishnuvardhan intro fight

Soundtrack

Gurukiran scored the film's background music and composed for its soundtrack, with lyrics for the tracks written by V. Manohar, Kaviraj, V. Nagendra Prasad and Goturi. The soundtrack album, which received positive reviews from critics, consists of six tracks. The track Kaalavannu Tadeyoru was taken from the 1977 film, Kittu Puttu which had Dwarakish and Vishnuvardhan playing the lead roles as well, alongside Manjula, the lyrics for which was written by Chi. Udayashankar.

Awards

52nd Filmfare Awards South

The film, won five Filmfare Awards that includes:
 Best Film – Kannada: Dwarakish
 Best Director – Kannada: P. Vasu
 Best Actor – Kannada: Vishnuvardhan
 Best Actress – Kannada: Soundarya
 Best Music Director – Kannada: Gurukiran

Reception 
Sify wrote, "This is a well made film in which talented actress Soundarya made her last appearance in a Kannada film which is a supernatural thriller. Gurukiran’s music is a major advantage for the film and on the whole Aptamithra is worth a watch." By the film's 34th week it collected over 10 crores  at box office. The release of Chandramukhi did not affect the film's collections. It completed one year (52 weeks) screening at Santosh theatre in Bangalore.

References

External links
 
 Film review

2004 films
Indian horror films
Films scored by Gurukiran
2000s Kannada-language films
Kannada films remade in other languages
2004 horror films
Indian horror film remakes
Kannada remakes of Malayalam films
Films directed by P. Vasu